Colin Bruce may also refer to:

 Colin Bruce (actor), in the 1988 film Gotham and others
 Colin Bruce (author), British science writer
 Colin R. Bruce II, editor and chief compiler of Standard Catalog of World Coins
 Colin S. Bruce (born 1965), American federal judge

See also
 Colin Bryce (born 1974), British bobsledder and television presenter
 Bruce Dwight Collins (born 1968), American radio host